Stephen Paul Fleming  (born 1 April 1973) is a New Zealand cricket coach and former captain of the New Zealand national cricket team, who is the current head coach of Indian Premier League team Chennai Super Kings. He is considered one of the greatest batsmen for the New Zealand national cricket team.

Known for his astute tactical abilities, he is New Zealand's second-most capped Test cricketer with 111 appearances. He is also the team's longest-serving and most successful captain, having led the side to 28 victories and having won Test series against India, England, West Indies, Sri Lanka, Bangladesh and Zimbabwe.

He is the winning captain of the 2000 ICC KnockOut Trophy, which is New Zealand's only ICC trophy till date in the ODI format. Fleming captained New Zealand in the historic first Twenty20 International of the world, which was played against Australia in 2005.

He retired from international cricket on 26 March 2008. Fleming played in the 2008 Indian Premier League for the Chennai Super Kings after being signed for US$350,000 and became the team's coach from 2009. In February 2015 he was signed as coach of the Melbourne Stars of the Big Bash League. On 19 January 2018 he resumed his duties as head coach of the Chennai Super Kings in 2018 Indian Premier League season again, after the team was barred from playing in the tournament for two seasons. He coached the Rising Pune Supergiant during this time. He is appointed as the head coach of Joburg super kings in 2022 for the SA20 league.He is one of the best  coaches in the IPL so far.

Personal life
Fleming is the son of Pauline Fleming and Gary Kirk.  Pauline raised him as a single mother, and he did not meet his father until he was 16, although Kirk had always maintained a keen interest in his son's progress. Both Kirk and Fleming played senior rugby and captained Cashmere High's first XV.

On 9 May 2007, Fleming married his long-term partner Kelly Payne in a ceremony held in Wellington. The couple had a daughter, born in 2006, and a son, in 2008. He had to return to New Zealand just before the semifinals of the IPL tournament for the birth of his second child.

Fleming was appointed an Officer of the New Zealand Order of Merit, for services to cricket, in the 2011 Queen's Birthday Honours.

Domestic career
Fleming has played county cricket in England for Middlesex, Yorkshire and Nottinghamshire. He captained Nottinghamshire to County Championship victory in 2005, their first Championship title in 18 years.

There was speculation in 2007 that he might join the controversial Indian Twenty20 league, the Indian Cricket League.  However it turned out to be unfounded and he later joined the 'official' Indian Twenty20 league, the Indian Premier League, and played for the Chennai Super Kings in the league's initial incarnation.

International career
A left-handed batsman, Fleming made his Test debut in March 1994 against India winning the Man of the Match award on debut after scoring 92. In 1995 he survived controversy when he was caught and admitted to smoking marijuana with teammates Matthew Hart and Dion Nash while on tour at their hotel. In England's tour of New Zealand in 1996–97 he scored his maiden Test century in the First Test at Auckland. In the Third Test of the tour he took over the captaincy from Lee Germon becoming New Zealand's youngest captain at 23 years and 321 days.

Captaincy
He was particularly noted for his captaincy, having been praised from the likes of Shane Warne as the "best captain in world cricket" and most recently, Graeme Swann who said that Fleming is one of the two true leaders that he's ever seen, alongside Andrew Strauss.

Fleming became New Zealand's most successful captain in September 2000 with a victory over Zimbabwe. This was the 12th win under his captaincy overtaking Geoff Howarth. Fleming was regarded by some as an underperformer with the bat, with one of the worst 50 to 100 conversion ratios in world cricket. However, since the 2003 tour of Sri Lanka, Fleming started to gain form, with 274 not out against Sri Lanka – when he declared rather than staying to reach 300 which would have been a record in New Zealand cricket history.

Arguably Fleming's best ODI innings was his unbeaten 134 to help New Zealand beat hosts South Africa in the 2003 Cricket World Cup. Chasing a rain adjusted target of 229 off 39 overs, Fleming hit 134 off just 132 deliveries as New Zealand cruised to a 9-wicket victory over a team they had struggled against in the past.

In the second Test between New Zealand and South Africa at Newlands, Cape Town in April 2006, Fleming scored his 3rd Test double-century and became the first New Zealander to achieve this feat. Fleming scored 262 as he and Wellington teammate James Franklin put 256 runs for the 8th wicket, the highest partnership to date in Tests between New Zealand and South Africa. It is also a New Zealand record for the 8th wicket against any country.

On 25 October 2006, Fleming captained his country for the 194th time in an ODI – a world record, overtaking Arjuna Ranatunga. He played well throughout the 2007 World Cup scoring 353 runs at an average of 39.22 and was New Zealand's second highest run scorer in the tournament. He failed in the semi-final against Sri Lanka scoring just 1 off 4 balls as New Zealand went on to lose the match and crashed out of the tournament. On 24 April 2007, Fleming resigned as the ODI captain of the Blackcaps. The announcement was made in a post-match press conference held after the Semi-Final defeat to Sri Lanka in the 2007 Cricket World Cup. After Fleming's last match as captain, Mahela Jayawardene added a tribute. "Stephen's been a great leader for New Zealand for some time, and you could learn a lot from him". Over a decade of leading the side he finished with 218 games, 98 wins, 106 losses.

As of April 2007, Fleming had captained New Zealand in 80 Test matches—a New Zealand record and the second highest number worldwide
. As a fielder Fleming took over 170 catches, giving him the 3rd highest Test aggregate for a non-wicketkeeper.

Post-captaincy
In September 2007, Fleming was replaced by Daniel Vettori as the New Zealand Test captain. He also left English county Nottinghamshire after three years as captain. In February 2008 Fleming ended speculation and confirmed his retirement from the New Zealand team at the end of England's 2008 tour of New Zealand to spend more time with his family, and to play for the Indian Premier League.

He played well in his final series, scoring 297 in six innings. In the first innings of the second test against England, he scored his 7000th run in his 110th match. In his final test at, Napier, he scored half-centuries in both innings to ensure that he finished with a Test match average of over 40 (40.06).

Playing style
Fleming was an elegant left handed batsman and played shots such as the flick off the pads, straight drive, cover drive and cut shots. He was also a clever captain and his field placings for many batsmen like Damien Martyn at point and aggressive captaincy made the opposition struggle for their runs. He was also a prolific slip catcher and fielded well in close-in positions.

International centuries

Fleming, a left-handed batsman, has made 17 centuries in international cricket  nine in Test matches and eight in One Day Internationals  and sits ninety-sixth in the list of century-makers in international cricket.

Test centuries

One Day International centuries

After cricket

Coaching
Fleming played for Chennai Super Kings in the 2008 Indian Premier League. He was appointed as the team's head coach in 2009 and retired as a player. The side won the IPL in 2010 as well as the Champions League Twenty20 and went on to win the IPL again the following season. He coached Chennai for six seasons before the side was suspended from the IPL for two years. In 2016 he became the coach of Rising Pune Supergiants.

In 2018 Fleming returned as coach of Chennai after the team's suspension ended. The team won the IPL during 2018 and repeated the success in 2021.

Business interests
Fleming has since been involved in setting up CricHQ with the company's CEO Simon Baker and former New Zealand cricket captain Brendon McCullum. Fleming is one of 160 investors and a director in the company. In June 2015 the company raised US$10m from Singapore private equity firm Tembusu Partners to expand globally.

References

External links

New Zealand cricketers
New Zealand expatriate sportspeople in England
New Zealand One Day International captains
New Zealand One Day International cricketers
New Zealand Test cricket captains
New Zealand Test cricketers
New Zealand Twenty20 International captains
New Zealand Twenty20 International cricketers
New Zealand Youth One Day International captains
New Zealand Youth Test captains
Canterbury cricketers
Middlesex cricketers
Nottinghamshire cricketers
Nottinghamshire cricket captains
Wellington cricketers
Yorkshire cricketers
ICC World XI One Day International cricketers
Cricketers at the 1996 Cricket World Cup
Cricketers at the 1999 Cricket World Cup
Cricketers at the 2003 Cricket World Cup
Cricketers at the 2007 Cricket World Cup
Cricketers at the 1998 Commonwealth Games
Commonwealth Games bronze medallists for New Zealand
1973 births
Living people
Chennai Super Kings cricketers
Officers of the New Zealand Order of Merit
Cricketers from Christchurch
Indian Premier League coaches
Big Bash League coaches
New Zealand cricket coaches
Commonwealth Games medallists in cricket
South Island cricketers
Medallists at the 1998 Commonwealth Games